Ahmad Shah Abdali 4-day Tournament is a four-day cricket tournament in Afghanistan played between five regional teams, each representing a number of Afghan provinces.

Up to and including the 2016–17 Tournament, the matches were not given first-class status. However, at an International Cricket Council (ICC) meeting in February 2017, first-class status was awarded to all future matches, starting with the 2017–18 tournament. It is named after founder of the Durrani Empire, Ahmad Shah Durrani.

History 

Afghanistan's multi-day tournament initially began as a three-day competition before moving to a four-day structure in 2014, now known as the Ahmad Shah Abdali tournament, with five regional teams competing - Amo, Band-e-Amir, Boost, Mis Ainak and Speen Ghar. A sixth team, Kabul, joined the competition in 2016. The teams play each other twice before the two sides at the top of the table play for the end of season championship. The competition runs from September through December. In February 2017 the International Cricket Council (ICC) awarded first-class status to Afghanistan's four-day domestic competition.

Teams 

Current teams (2022)

Former teams

Champions
This table lists all the champions of the Ahmad Shah Abdali 4-day Tournament during the competition's first-class era.

See also

Cricket in Afghanistan
History of cricket
Etisalat ODD Challenge Cup
Shpageeza Cricket League

References

External links
-official website

Afghan domestic cricket competitions
Cricket in Afghanistan
First-class cricket competitions